|}

This is a list of electoral district results of the 1939 Western Australian election.

Results by Electoral district

Albany

Avon

Beverley

Boulder 

 Preferences were not distributed.

Brown Hill-Ivanhoe

Bunbury

Canning

Claremont

Collie

East Perth

Forrest

Fremantle

Gascoyne

Geraldton

Greenough

Guildford-Midland

Hannans

Irwin-Moore

Kalgoorlie

Kanowna

Katanning

Kimberley

Leederville

Maylands

Middle Swan

Mount Hawthorn

Mount Magnet

Mount Marshall

Murchison

Murray-Wellington

Nedlands

Nelson

North Perth

North-East Fremantle

Northam

Perth

Pilbara

Pingelly

Roebourne

South Fremantle

Subiaco

Sussex

Swan

Toodyay

Victoria Park

Wagin

West Perth

Williams-Narrogin

Yilgarn-Coolgardie

York

See also 

 1939 Western Australian state election
 Members of the Western Australian Legislative Assembly, 1939–1943

References 

Results of Western Australian elections
1939 elections in Australia